Usayd al-Adani was a senior leader of Al-Qaeda in the Arabian Peninsula.
He was killed by a missile launched from a surveillance drone, on March 2, 2017.
His killing attracted additional scrutiny as one of the seven other individuals killed by the missile was Yasir al-Silmi, said to be another name for an individual formerly held in extrajudicial detention in Guantanamo, Mohamed Tahar.

After his death American officials claimed al-Adani was not just the leader of AQAP's efforts in Abyan Province, but that he was also an experienced bomb-maker.  Courtney Kube, reporting for NBC News reported that he was killed in the village of Wadi Yashbum in Shabwa Governorate.

References

2017 deaths
Yemeni al-Qaeda members
Deaths by United States drone strikes in Yemen
People from Shabwah Governorate
Year of birth missing
People killed in the Yemeni Civil War (2014–present)